The 1756 Düren earthquake occurred on the morning at 8 a.m. near the town of Düren with a magnitude of 6.4 on the Richter scale. It was one of the strongest earthquakes in Central Europe, and the strongest in Germany's recorded history. The depth of the hypocenter is estimated at 14–16 kilometers. However this earthquake may have been a remotely triggered event from the 1755 earthquake in Lisbon but there is not enough evidence for this.

Earthquake 
The quake caused damage to buildings in the Cologne, Aachen, Jülich and Bad Münstereifel area. The earthquake was felt in Berlin, Stuttgart and as far away as London and Paris. Damage corresponded to intensity level VIII on the Medvedev–Sponheuer–Karnik scale. According to today's assessment, it reached a magnitude of 6.4 on the Richter scale; significantly stronger than the earthquake in Roermond in 1992, which reached a magnitude of 5.9.

Damage and casualties
There were two deaths in Düren, where many buildings were badly damaged. Parts of the city walls of Düren and Bad Münstereifel collapsed or were heavily damaged. Some of the hot springs in Aachen ran dry, while others increased in strength. A spring at Breinigerberg also ran dry. The water table fell in open tin and lead mines some became dry.

Two people were also killed and one man was seriously injured in Aachen. In addition, over 300 chimneys collapsed in Cologne.  Damage was also reported in neighbouring countries.

See also
List of earthquakes in Germany
List of historical earthquakes

References

Earthquakes in Germany
Earthquakes in the Netherlands
Düren (district)
1756 in Europe
18th-century earthquakes